P.A.O.K. Volleyball Club or PAOK Volley, is a Greek volleyball club based in Thessaloniki and part of the major multi-sport club PAOK. The department was founded in 1933 and refounded in 1948 after the Axis occupation. Their home ground is PAOK Sports Arena. PAOK has won 3 National Championships (2015, 2016, 2017) and 4 Domestic Cups (2015, 2018, 2019, 2022).

The team had its first participation in the CEV Champions League during the 2015–16 season.

Current squad
Season 2022–23

Board of directors

Technical staff

Honours

Domestic competitions
  Greek Championship
 Winners (3): 2014–15, 2015–16, 2016–17

  Greek Cup
Winners (4):  2014–15, 2017–18, 2018–19, 2021–22

 Double
 Winners (1): 2014−15

Notable players

  Chrysanthos Kyriazis
  Vassilis Mitroudis
  Ioannis Pantakidis
  Menelaos Kokkinakis
  Dimitris Orologas 
  Theodoros Bozidis
  Theoklitos Karipidis
  Giannis Kalmazidis
  Nikos Karagiannis
  Andreas Andreadis
  Georgios Stefanou
  Thanasis Psaras
  Ilias Lappas
  Giannis Melkas
  Gerasimos Kanellos
  Vasileios Kournetas
  Sotiris Amarianakis
  Giannis Charitonidis
  Konstantinos Prousalis
  Nikolaos Smaragdis
  Dimitrios Gkaras
  Sotirios Sotiriou
  Georgios Petreas
  Thanos Terzis
  Apostolos Armenakis
  Ioannis Takouridis
  Panagiotis Pelekoudas
  Rafail Koumentakis
  Mitar Tzourits
  Dima Filippov
  Andrej Kravárik
  Nikolay Uchikov
  Plamen Konstantinov
  Nikolay Jeliazkov
  Ivaylo Gavrilov
  Vladimir Grbić (FIVB Hall of Fame)
  Saša Starović
  Aleksandar Okolić
  Đula Mešter
  Marko Bojić
  Jernej Potocnik
  Artur Udrys
  Dmitry Ilinikh
  Olli-Pekka Ojansivu
  Matti Hietanen
  Ralph Bergmann
  Matthias Valkiers
  Ronald Zoodsma
  Niels Klapwijk
  Alexander Shafranovich
  Yoichi Kato
  David Lee
  Kevin Hansen
  Michael Lambert
  Paul Lotman
  Evan Patak
  James Polster
  Riley Salmon
  Clayton Stanley
  Michael Diehl
  Kyle Robinson
  Jayson Jablonsky
  Garrett Muagututia
  Steven Marshall
  Brett Walsh
  Dante Amaral
  Ernardo Gómez
  Javier Jiménez
  Rolando Cepeda
  Freddy Brooks

Notable coaches
  Sotiris Ieroklis
  Ilias Ieroklis
  Stelios Kazazis
  Alekos Leonis
  Giannis Melkas
  Kostas Charitonidis
  Giannis Kalmazidis
  Jorge Elgueta
  Danielle Ricci
  Yuriy Filippov

Historical performance in Volleyleague and Greek Cup

 The 2019-20 Cup was abandoned due to COVID-19 while PAOK was in the semi-finals. The 2020-21 Cup was not held for the same reasons

Positions in Volleyleague

Greek Cup Finals

European record 

 Total points system

See also
 PAOK Women's Volleyball Club

Sponsorships 
Official Sponsor: OPAP, Sportingbet
Official Sport Clothing Manufacturer: Legea
Official Broadcaster: Nova Sports

References

External links 
https://www.paokvolley.gr/ (Official site in Greek)
http://www.volleyball.gr/
http://www.volleyleague.gr/
Press
PAOK24 

 
Greek volleyball clubs
Volleyball clubs established in 1933
1933 establishments in Greece